is the seventh original album by the Japanese taiko group Kodō (鼓童).

Track listing

References 

1996 albums